The Henderson Bridge (New Red Bridge) is a bridge in Rhode Island which spans the Seekonk River, and connects the East Side neighborhood of Providence with the Watchemoket and Phillipsdale neighborhoods of East Providence.

History
The bridge was opened in 1969 to replace an old bridge to the south, known as the Red Bridge, which connected the ends of Waterman Street on either side of the Seekonk River.  The bridge was named after its designer, George Henderson (engineer), of Rumford, Rhode Island.

Previous bridges in the area
This is the sixth bridge to have been built in this part of the Seekonk River.  The first was a wooden bridge built by Moses Brown in 1793 called the Central Bridge, which connected the respective ends of Waterman Avenue.  The same year, Brown's brother John built the first Washington Bridge at a ferry landing point one mile south, connecting India Point and Watchemoket Square.  The second and third bridges were built as replacements and were destroyed in 1807 and 1815, respectively. A swing bridge was built in 1872, which was replaced by a sturdier bridge of the same type in 1895.

Henderson Expressway
The Henderson Bridge was part of an envisioned expressway that was planned as a US 44 freeway that would have extended from a Gano Street interchange with Interstate 195. The current Gano Street ramps were built specifically for the proposed US 44 freeway, which was planned to follow along the west shore of the Seekonk River, over the Henderson Bridge, and then head northeasterly through East Providence, to US 44 just east of Route 114 and US 1A. Since the freeway was never completed, the section that exists today was not given a route number, though is commonly referred to as the Henderson Expressway. The planned freeway's right-of-way and landholdings still exist in East Providence, where they are completely cleared to the freeway's proposed end at US 44.

Under the Bridge
Woods and trails under and around the East Providence side of the bridge are often used by dirt-bikers for recreational use. River Road exists beneath the Providence side of the bridge, and provides access to Blackstone Park and Trails (a breach in the fence-line on the westbound side of the bridge near the "South Angell Street" signage provides quick access into the park); (a short path on the eastbound side of the bridge before the ascent onto the bridge provides access to River Road).

Repair work
On April 17, 2008, it was reported that the bridge requires $50 million worth of repairs, but the state only had $3.3 million to allocate.  Some problems noted are cracks in the concrete pier caps & rusting steel beams.  RIDOT chief engineer Kazem Farhoumand has stated that steel reinforcements can be bolted onto the steel beams to make them "good for another 5 or 10 years." The Henderson was one of 25 bridges to receive "minor repairs" in late 2015, after a "hurry-up" program of bridge inspections in August 2015.

2021 reconstruction

Transit and bike advocates have asked for years that the bridge be replaced by a more multimodal structure. In February 2019 it was announced that the existing four lane bridge will be replaced with a new two lane bridge with pedestrian and bike lanes.

Work began on reconstruction in January 2021. The project is expected to cost $84.4 million, with $54.5 million coming from a federal spending bill and the rest from the state. The bridge will remain open to traffic, with one half of the bridge closed and rebuilt at a time.

The new bridge will feature three traffic lanes (instead of the current six), and a separated bicycle/pedestrian infrastructure with connections to existing on-street bicycle networks. Current interchanges will be converted to roundabouts. While the bridge will include bike/pedestrian infrastructure, the interchange design on the east side of the Seekonk River has faced criticism for a lack of any way for pedestrians or cyclists to safely cross traffic lanes.

See also

Washington Bridge
Crook Point Bascule Bridge

References

External links

Steve Anderson's BostonRoads.com: Henderson Expressway
http://www.ri.gov/press/view.php?id=9194

Bridges completed in 1969
Bridges in Providence County, Rhode Island
Road bridges in Rhode Island
1969 establishments in Rhode Island
Steel bridges in the United States